Conrad Potter Aiken (August 5, 1889 – August 17, 1973) was an American writer and poet, honored with a Pulitzer Prize and a National Book Award, and was United States Poet Laureate from 1950 to 1952. His published works include poetry, short stories, novels, literary criticism, a play, and an autobiography.

Biography

Early years
Aiken was the eldest son of William Ford and Anna (Potter) Aiken. In Savannah, Aiken's father became a respected physician and eye surgeon, while his mother was the daughter of a prominent Massachusetts Unitarian minister. On February 27, 1901, Dr. Aiken murdered his wife and then committed suicide. According to his autobiography, Ushant, Aiken, then 11 years old, heard the two gunshots and discovered the bodies immediately thereafter. After his parents' deaths, he was raised by his great-aunt and uncle in Cambridge, Massachusetts, attending Middlesex School, then Harvard University.

At Harvard, Aiken edited the Advocate with T. S. Eliot, who became a lifelong friend, colleague, and influence. It was also at Harvard where Aiken studied under another significant influence in his writing, the philosopher George Santayana.

Adult years
Aiken was strongly influenced by symbolism, especially in his earlier works. In 1930 he received the Pulitzer Prize for Poetry for his Selected Poems. Many of his writings had strong psychological themes. He wrote the widely anthologized short story "Silent Snow, Secret Snow" (1934), partially based on his childhood tragedy.

Other influences were Aiken's grandfather, Potter, who had been a church preacher, as well as Whitman's freestyle poetry.  This helped Aiken shape his poetry more freely while his recognition of a God grounded his more visually rich explorations into the universe. Some of his best-known poetry, such as "Morning Song of Senlin", uses these influences to great effect.

His collections of verse include Earth Triumphant (1914), The Charnel Rose (1918) and And In the Hanging Gardens (1933). His poem "Music I Heard" has been set to music by a number of composers, including Leonard Bernstein, Henry Cowell, and Helen Searles Westbrook. Aiken wrote or edited more than 51 books, the first of which was published in 1914, two years after his graduation from Harvard. His work includes novels, short stories (The Collected Short Stories appeared in 1961), reviews, an autobiography, and poetry. He received numerous awards and honors for his writing, though for most of his lifetime, he received little public attention.

Though Aiken was reluctant to speak of his early trauma and ensuing psychological problems, he acknowledged that his writings were strongly influenced by his studies of Sigmund Freud, Carl G. Jung, Otto Rank, Ferenczi, Adler, and other depth psychologists. It wasn't until the publication of his autobiography, Ushant, that Aiken revealed the emotional challenges that he had battled for much of his adult life. During the 1920s Freud heard of him and offered to psychoanalyze him. While aboard a Europe-bound ship to meet with Freud, Aiken was discouraged by Erich Fromm from accepting the offer. Consequently, despite Freud's strong influence on Aiken, Aiken never met the noted psychoanalyst. As he later said, "Freud had read Great Circle, and I’m told kept a copy on his office table. But I didn't go, though I started to. Misgivings set in, and so did poverty."

Personal life
Aiken had three younger siblings, Kempton Potter (K. P. A. Taylor), Robert Potter (R. P. A. Taylor), and Elizabeth. After their parents' deaths, the four children were adopted by Frederick Winslow Taylor and his wife Louise, their great-aunt. His siblings took Taylor's last name. Kempton helped establish the Aiken Taylor Award for Modern American Poetry.

He was married three times: firstly to Jessie McDonald (1912–1929); secondly to Clarissa Lorenz (1930–1937) (author of a biography, Lorelei Two); and thirdly to the painter Mary Hoover (1937–1973). He fathered three children by his first wife Jessie: John Aiken, Jane Aiken Hodge and Joan Aiken, all of whom became writers.

Aiken married Jessie McDonald in 1912, and the couple moved to England in 1921 with their older two children; John (born 1913) and Jane (born 1917), settling in Rye, East Sussex (where the American novelist Henry James had once lived). The couple’s youngest daughter, Joan, was born in Rye in 1924. Conrad Aiken returned to Cambridge, Massachusetts, as a tutor at Harvard from 1927 to 1928. For many years, he divided his time between Rye, New York, and Boston. In 1931 he was introduced by the artist Paul Nash to Edward Burra, a painter also living in Rye. That year Burra painted his gouache "John Deth", inspired by Aiken's poem of that name and originally intended to illustrate a projected edition that was never realised. Nevertheless, the two men maintained a lifelong friendship thereafter.

In 1936, Aiken met his third wife, Mary, in Boston. In the following year the couple visited Malcolm Lowry in Cuernavaca, Mexico, where Aiken divorced Clarissa and married Mary. The couple moved to Rye, where they remained until the outbreak of World War II in 1940. The Aikens settled in Brewster, Massachusetts, on Cape Cod, where he and his wife Mary later ran a summer program for writers and painters named after their antique farmhouse, "Forty-One Doors". Despite living for many years abroad and receiving recognition as a Southern writer, Aiken always considered himself an American, and, in particular, a New Englander.

Over the years, he served in loco parentis as well as mentor to the English author Malcolm Lowry. In 1923 he acted as a witness at the marriage of his friend, poet W. H. Davies. From 1950 to 1952, he served as Poet Laureate Consultant in Poetry to the Library of Congress, more commonly known as Poet Laureate of the United States. In 1960 he visited Grasmere in the Lake District, England (once the home of William Wordsworth), with his friend Edward Burra.

The Aikens lived primarily at their farmhouse in West Brewster, and wintered in Savannah in a home adjacent to his early childhood house. 

Aiken died on 17 August 1973 and was buried in Bonaventure Cemetery in Savannah, Georgia on the banks of the Wilmington River, and so was Mary after her death in 1992. The burial site was featured in Midnight in the Garden of Good and Evil by John Berendt. According to local legend, Aiken wished to have his tombstone fashioned in the shape of a bench as an invitation to visitors to stop and enjoy a martini at his grave. The bench is inscribed with "Give my love to the world", and "Cosmos Mariner—Destination Unknown".

A primary source for information on Aiken's life is his autobiographical novel Ushant (1952), one of his major works. In it, he wrote candidly about his various affairs and marriages, his attempted suicide and fear of insanity, and his friendships with T. S. Eliot (who appears in the book as the Tsetse), Ezra Pound (Rabbi Ben Ezra), Malcolm Lowry (Hambo), and others.

Awards and recognition
Named Poetry Consultant (now U.S. Poet Laureate) of the Library of Congress from 1950 to 1952, Aiken earned numerous prestigious writing honors, including a Pulitzer Prize in 1930 for Selected Poems, the 1954 National Book Award for Collected Poems, the Bollingen Prize in Poetry, the National Institute of Arts and Letters Gold Medal in Poetry, and a National Medal for Literature. He was awarded a Guggenheim fellowship in 1934, Academy of American Poets fellowship in 1957, Huntington Hartford Foundation Award in 1960, and Brandeis University Creative Arts Award in 1967. Aiken was the first Georgia-born author to win a Pulitzer Prize, and was named Georgia's Poet Laureate in 1973. He was the first winner of the Poetry Society of America (PSA) Shelley Memorial Award, in 1929.

In 2009, the Library of America selected Aiken's 1931 story "Mr. Arcularis" for inclusion in its two-century retrospective of American fantastic tales.

Selected works

Poetry collections
 Earth Triumphant (Aiken, 1914) (available online at archive.org)
 Turns and Movies and other Tales in Verse (Aiken, 1916, Houghton Mifflin) (available online at archive.org)
 The Jig of Forslin: A Symphony, 1916 
 Nocturne of Remembered Spring: And Other Poems (Aiken, 1917) (available online at archive.org)
 Charnel Rose (Aiken, 1918) (available online at archive.org)
 The House of Dust: A Symphony, 1920 
 Punch: The Immortal Liar, Documents in His History, 1921 
 Priapus and the Pool, 1922 
 The Pilgrimage of Festus, 1923 
 Priapus and the Pool, and Other Poems, 1925 
 Selected Poems, 1929 
 John Deth, A Metaphysical Legacy, and Other Poems, 1930 
 The Coming Forth by Day of Osiris Jones, 1931 
 Preludes for Memnon, 1931 
 Landscape West of Eden, 1934 
 Time in the Rock; Preludes to Definition, 1936 
 And in the Human Heart, 1940 
 Brownstone Eclogues, and Other Poems, 1942 
 The Soldier: A Poem, 1944 
 The Kid, 1947 
 The Divine Pilgrim, 1949 
 Skylight One: Fifteen Poems, 1949 
 Collected Poems, 1953
 A Letter from Li Po and Other Poems, 1955 
 Sheepfold Hill: Fifteen Poems, 1958 
 The Morning Song of Lord Zero, Poems Old and New, 1963 
 Thee: A Poem, 1967
 Collected Poems, 2nd ed., 1970

Short stories
 "Bring! Bring!"
 "The Last Visit"
 "Mr. Arcularis"
 "The Bachelor Supper"
 "Bow Down, Isaac!"
 "A Pair of Vikings"
 "Hey, Taxi!"
 "Field of Flowers"
 "Gehenna"
 "The Disciple"
 "Impulse"
 "The Anniversary"
 "Hello, Tib"
 "Smith and Jones"
 "By My Troth, Nerisa!"
 "Silent Snow, Secret Snow"
 "Round by Round"
 "Thistledown"
 "State of Mind"
 "Strange Moonlight"
 "The Fish Supper"
 "I Love You Very Dearly"
 "The Dark City"
 "Life Isn't a Short Story"
 "The Night Before Prohibition"
 "Spider, Spider"
 "A Man Alone at Lunch"
 "Farewell! Farewell! Farewell!"
 "Your Obituary, Well Written"
 "A Conversation"
 "No, No, Go Not to Lethe"
 "Pure as the Driven Snow"
 "All, All Wasted"
 "The Moment"
 "The Woman-Hater"
 "The Professor's Escape"
 "The Orange Moth"
 "The Necktie"
 "O How She Laughed!"
 "West End"
 "Fly Away Ladybird"

Novels
 Blue Voyage (1927)
 Great Circle (1933)
 King Coffin (1935)
 A Heart for the Gods of Mexico (1939)
 The Conversation (1940)

Other books
 Scepticisms: Notes on Contemporary Poetry (1919)
 Ushant (1952)
 A Reviewer's ABC: Collected Criticism of Conrad Aiken from 1916 to the Present (1958)
 Collected Short Stories (1960)
 Collected Short Stories of Conrad Aiken (1965)

References

External links

Poems by Conrad Aiken An extensive collection of Aiken's poetry
Conrad Aiken: Unitarian Prodigy Poet Biography

Conrad Aiken's Grave in Savannah, Georgia
New Georgia Encyclopedia entry
Index entry for Conrad Aiken at Poets' Corner
Famous Poets and Poems, Aiken Biography
Bookrags.com
Libs.uga.edu
Collected Poems by Conrad Aiken on the National Book Awards Poetry Blog

Guides to Conrad Aiken's prose, poetry, and correspondence at Houghton Library, Harvard University

Conrad Aiken historical marker
Conrad Aiken at the Stuart A. Rose Manuscript, Archives, and Rare Book Library

1889 births
1973 deaths
19th-century American novelists
19th-century American short story writers
19th-century American male writers
20th-century American male writers
20th-century American novelists
20th-century American poets
20th-century American short story writers
20th-century Unitarians
American male novelists
American male poets
American male short story writers
American Poets Laureate
American Unitarians
Bollingen Prize recipients
Burials in Georgia (U.S. state)

Federal Writers' Project people
Harvard Advocate alumni
Members of the American Academy of Arts and Letters
Middlesex School alumni
National Book Award winners
Novelists from Georgia (U.S. state)
Poets from Georgia (U.S. state)
Pulitzer Prize for Poetry winners
Writers from Savannah, Georgia
Poets Laureate of Georgia (U.S. state)